The 2020 Dutch Indoor Athletics Championships was the 49th edition of the national championship in indoor track and field for the Netherlands, organised by the Royal Dutch Athletics Federation. It was held on 22–23 February at the Omnisport Apeldoorn in Apeldoorn. A total of 24 events (divided evenly between the sexes) were contested over the two-day competition.

Results

Men

Women

References

Results
 NK Indoor Senioren 2020 . Royal Dutch Athletics Federation. Retrieved 2020-03-02.

Dutch Indoor Athletics Championships
Dutch Indoor Athletics Championships
Dutch Indoor Athletics Championships
Dutch Indoor Athletics Championships
Sports competitions in Apeldoorn